Steytler is a surname found most commonly in South Africa. People with the name include:

 Abraham Isaac Steytler (1840–1922), South African clergyman
 Bill Steytler (born 1947), South African cricketer
 Christopher Steytler (born ?), South African-born Australian judge
 Jan Steytler (1910–?), South African politician
 Matthew Jacobs Steytler (1895–1977), South African Springbok Marathon Runner. Born in Vryheid, KwaZulu-Natal 5 June 1895, died 20 April 1977.

Afrikaans-language surnames